The Giga Press program is a series of aluminium die casting machines manufactured for Tesla, initially by Idra Group in Italy. Each machine weighs .

Base specification Giga Press machines have been included in Idra's catalogue since 2018, with usage of a custom  Giga Press begun by Tesla, Inc. in late-2020 for the production of chassis parts for the Tesla Model Y.

The cycle time is ~80‒90 seconds, allowing an initial output rate of 40‒45 completed castings per hour, or ~1,000 castings per day.

Principle of operation

Die casting works by forcing molten metal alloy inside a reusable mold, then opening the mold to remove the finished piece after it has solidified. Each fresh casting is trimmed to approximate size, measured, checked for imperfections, and sent for CNC machining to finished size.

To prevent the formation of oxides, a tank blanket of nitrogen gas covers the molten aluminium, which is circulated to maintain an even temperature.

At the beginning of each casting cycle robots spray  of soybean oil in a thin layer inside each half of the mold to allow separation. The mold is closed, and a low vacuum of  created by pumping out the air from inside.

A mechanical trim press cuts the approximate edges, with excess aluminium being recycled back into the melting oven. The remaining useful part of the casting is X-rayed to check the internal structure, trimmed by laser, drilled for fittings, and then computer-measured for accuracy.

Die structure
Tesla's Model Y rear casting dies has four known visible parts:

 2 big classic main facing dies, oriented vertically with injection from the bottom of the immobile one.
 2 smaller side wedging dies, moving in for injection and out for removal.

The front casting suggests an identical die layout, with maybe a 5th wedging die underneath (process) for the front-facing (car) crash rail mount.

Metal alloy
According to analysis by Sandy Munro, the casting aluminium alloy used in the large Tesla chassis parts is primarily an aluminium 89.5%‒silicon 8.5% mix, plus several other trace elements, falling within the categorisation of Aluminum Association alloy "AA 386":

Components
Vacuum inside the closed mold is achieved using a 4,000-litre tank made by Fondarex in Switzerland.

Molten metal is pumped through heated pipes, and rotary degassing is performed to reduce porosity in the casting.

Steps and machinery involved: 
 StrikoMelter Melting and Holding Furnace
 Holding oven (~)
 Giga Press ("DCM"‒Die-casting Machine)
 Quench oil tank
 Mechanical trim press
 X-Ray machine (porosity check)
 Laser trim
 Drill and tap (machining)
 Laser scanning (coordinate-measuring machine)
 Fasteners insertion
 Scrap metal shredder (immediate closed loop recycling of aluminium offcuts)
 Vacuum system

Customers

Tesla
In 2019 Jerome Guillen indicated that Tesla Grohmann Automation were working on a "giant, giant, giant machine" to "make full-size cars in the same way that toy cars are made".

The two biggest casting machines in the world had been purchased by Tesla, according to Elon Musk in April 2020, to enable casting the Tesla Model Y rear chassis and crash rails as a single component. In January 2021, Elon Musk announced that also the rear chassis of the Tesla Cybertruck would be produced using an over- casting machine.  On 16 March 2021, an order had been placed with Idra for the first 8,000-tonne die machine.

 Tesla had five casting machines installed at Giga Shanghai, two machines installed at the Tesla Factory in California, two machines installed at Giga Berlin, and two machines at Giga Texas—plus foundations in preparation for many additional Giga Press machines.

During May/June 2022, Idra were assembling a  Giga Press.

Fremont

Preparation work for installation of the first Giga Press die casting machine ("") was planned to begin in California during May 2020.  In May 2020, Tesla requested building permits from the City of Fremont for demolishing a car wash at the Tesla Factory, and installing an arch-shaped metal building for casting machinery.  During May/June 2020 Tesla advertised a "Castings Tooling & Process Engineer" job, based at the Tesla Factory in Fremont, responsible for production ramp-up of the first Giga Press.  In June 2020, permits for foundations to support the Giga Press at Fremont were filed, then issued on 26 June 2020.

Preparations for the Drill and Tap (D&T) area required in-filling of a pit.
  Several platforms required installing.

At the end of July 2020, Tesla filed permit applications for construction work in preparation for Die-Casting Machine #2 at Fremont.

By early-August 2020, the casting cell and first Giga Press were substantially complete, having been assembled in the open air at the north end of the General Assembly building.  Permits for the testing laboratory were filed during August 2020.
()

During September 2020 the first Giga Press at Fremont (DCM1) started producing trial runs of the Model Y single-piece rear casting, and the second Giga Press at Fremont (DCM2) had been installed.

On 11 March 2021, one of the Fremont presses caught fire.

Germany
 plans for the Tesla Giga Berlin factory in Brandenburg included provision and piling foundations for eight  die casting machines.
()

Tesla Model Y vehicles built at Giga Berlin will have a redesigned structure.  European Model Y cars will use a front chassis megacasting, in addition to the rear chassis megacasting.  The first 1‒2 Giga Press machines at Berlin will be required for the Model Y chassis production, with the remainder allowing flexibility in casting large numbers of parts quickly.  The first two European Giga Press machines were planned to be delivered to Giga Berlin by the start of 2021.

Shanghai

Idra's parent company, LK Machinery held a factory tour in Shenzhen on 27 November 2019, during which a partially-complete machine was visible.  During the factory tour, the locally-produced Chinese machine was branded as "Impress-Plus DCC6000".

By October 2020, three Impress-Plus DCC6000 machines were being assembled for Model Y production at the Giga Shanghai factory.
()

By one year later in October 2021, five machines were available at Giga Shanghai.

Texas

For Tesla Model Y car production at Giga Texas beginning in 2022, Tesla began to deploy a single-piece front in addition to the existing single-piece rear casting.

During the night of 18/19 January 2021, concrete foundations for three Giga Press machines were poured at the Giga Texas factory location near Austin, Texas.
()

On 21 January 2021 the first Giga Press components started to arrive on site.

On 22 January 2021 the base frame of the first Giga Press was unboxed and moved into position.  By the end of January 2021 one compression platten had been lifted into place, with the other two ready for craning.

, all major components of the first Giga Press at the Austin site has been craned into place.

On 15 April 2021, components for a second Giga Press started arriving at Giga Texas.

Mexico
The large single-unit Giga Press castings are also a key part of the vehicle design for the Tesla next-generation vehicle
to be manufactured at the Gigafactory Mexico facility, on which construction was announced in March 2023.  Subsequent vehicles on Tesla's third high-volume automotive platform will also use the giga castings.

Glovitech
LK Technology delivered one Impress-Plus DCC 6000 machine for Glovitech of South Korea, installed in the Vân Trung Industrial Zone, Việt Yên District, Bắc Giang Province, Vietnam.  The machine is used for producing large Faraday cages (radio-frequency enclosures) for 5G mobile base stations.  The machine was delivered in December 2020, and produced the first castings in March 2021.

References

Fremont permits

External links

 
 
 
 
 

 Giga Press
Casting (manufacturing)
Tesla, Inc.
Press tools